Skate Board Park is a jazz album by Joe Farrell on the Xanadu Records label. It was recorded in January 1979.

Track listing
"Skate Board Park" (Joe Farrell) – 5:24
"Cliche Romance" (Farrell) – 6:58
"High Wire -- The Aerialist" (Chick Corea) – 6:17
"Speak Low" (O. Nash, K. Weill) – 5:44
"You Go to My Head" (J. F. Coots, H. Gillespie) – 6:39
"Bara-Bara" (Farrell) – 6:24

Personnel
 Chick Corea – piano, electric piano
 Joe Farrell – tenor sax
 Bob Magnusson – bass
 Larance Marable – drums

Recording credits
 Arne Frager – engineer
 Paul Goodman – mixing
 Joe Farrell – liner notes
 Don Schlitten – design, photography, producer

References

1979 albums
Joe Farrell albums
Chick Corea albums
Albums produced by Don Schlitten
Albums recorded at Van Gelder Studio